Netipong Sanmahung (born 4 March 1996), is a Thai professional footballer who plays as a centre-back for Thai League 3 club Uthai Thani.

International career
In 2018 he was part of the 2018 AFC U-23 Championship with Thailand U23.

Personal life
Netipong's brother, Jakkapong Sanmahung, is also a footballer.

References

External links
 

1996 births
Living people
Nitipong Sanmahung
Nitipong Sanmahung
Association football central defenders
Nitipong Sanmahung
Nitipong Sanmahung
Nitipong Sanmahung
Nitipong Sanmahung
Nitipong Sanmahung
Nitipong Sanmahung